Life is the eighth solo studio album by American rapper KRS-One. It was released on June 13, 2006 via Antagonist Records. Produced by the Resistance, it features guest appearance from the Footsoldiers. The album received generally positive reviews from music critics.

Track listing

Personnel
Lawrence "KRS-One" Parker – main artist
Theresa Jones – additional vocals (track 2)
Orlando "Triune" Solano Jr. – featured artist (track 4), additional vocals (track 6)
Ishmeal "Ishues" Cuthbertson – featured artist (track 6)
Dax Reynosa – additional vocals (track 6), producer, executive producer
Nazareth "DJ Rhettmatic" Nirza – scratches (track 7)
Raphael "Raphi" Henley – featured artist (track 8)
DJ Wize – scratches (track 9)
Jason "Propaganda" Petty – featured artist (track 10)
Donald "Dert" Baker – producer, design, layout
Habit – co-producer (track 3)
Justin "Dubb" Taylor – mixing
Chad Blinman – mastering

References

External links

2006 albums
KRS-One albums